Neoascia metallica (Williston, 1882), the Double-banded Fen Fly, is a common species of syrphid fly observed across North America. Hoverflies can remain nearly motionless in flight. The adults are also known as flower flies, for they are commonly found on flowers, from which they get both energy-giving nectar and protein-rich pollen. The larvae are aquatic.

Distribution
Canada, United States.

References

Eristalinae
Insects described in 1882
Diptera of North America
Taxa named by Samuel Wendell Williston